Lincoln Street is a prominent street  in Savannah, Georgia, United States. It is named for Benjamin Lincoln, a Revolutionary War hero. The street is one-way (northbound) south of Colonial Park Cemetery, which interrupts it between East Oglethorpe Avenue and East Perry Lane. The Lincoln Street Ramp leads down through Factors Walk to River Street and the Savannah River waterfront. Its northern section passes through the Savannah Historic District, a National Historic Landmark District.

Lincoln Street runs beside eight squares. From north to south:

To the west of
Warren Square
Columbia Square
Troup Square
Whitefield Square

To the east of
Reynolds Square
Oglethorpe Square 
Lafayette Square 
Calhoun Square

Notable buildings and structures

Below is a selection of notable buildings and structures on Lincoln Street, all in Savannah's Historic District. From north to south:

9 Lincoln Street (1853). In 2022, a judge ordered the building be demolished after a structural engineer found it to be "dangerous and unsound." It was subsequently decided that the building could be remodeled, with its historic materials kept intact.
17 Lincoln Street (1852)
Gordon–Anderson Building ("President's Quarters Inn"), 127–131 Lincoln Street (1855)
Joseph Sognier Property (I), 133–135 Lincoln Street (1886)
Joseph Gammon Property, 134 Lincoln Street (1843)
Joseph Sognier Property (II), 139–141 Lincoln Street (1886)
John Staley Duplex, 346–348 Lincoln Street (1853)
John Schwarz Row House, 436–442 Lincoln Street (1867)

References

Roads in Savannah, Georgia
Streets in Georgia (U.S. state)